Firestone may refer to:
Flint or firestone
Firestone (surname)

Places

Liberia
Firestone District, Margibi County, Liberia

United States
Firestone (Phoenix, Arizona), a listing on the National Register of Historic Places in Phoenix, Arizona
Firestone, Colorado, a town in Weld County, Colorado

Companies
Firestone Building Products, headquarters in Indianapolis, Indiana, US
Firestone Diamond Mining, Avontuur and Oena in Namaqualand, South Africa
Firestone Employees Society, New Zealand Trade Union
Firestone Tire and Rubber Company, an American company, a subsidiary of Bridgestone
Firestone Vineyard, Santa Barbara, California, US
Firestone Walker Fine Ales, Paso Robles, California, US

Other uses
Firestone (LACMTA station), a Los Angeles, California bus station, United States
Firestone (Pern), a fictional rock in the Dragonriders of Pern series by Anne McCaffrey
"Firestone" (song), a song by Kygo featuring Conrad Sewell

See also
Firestone Country Club, in Akron, Ohio, United States
Firestone Fieldhouse, a multipurpose arena in Malibu, California, United States
Firestone High School, on the northwest side of Akron, Ohio, United States
Harvey S. Firestone Memorial Library, the main library at Princeton University, United States
The Voice of Firestone, a weekly broadcast of classical music which appeared on the NBC radio network
Feuerstein